The Shroud Of is the debut studio album by American industrial act Minimal Man. It was released in 1981, through record label Subterranean.

Critical reception 

AllMusic's retrospective review of the album was positive, qualifying it as "murky", "moody" and "aggressive", comparing it to Suicide and Chrome. Trouser Press described the album as "a veritable nightmare in wax".

Track listing

Personnel 

 Patrick Miller – vocals, synthesizer, electronics, sleeve artwork and cover painting, production on "Two Little Skeletons"
 Andrew Baumer – bass guitar, soprano saxophone
 Lliam Hart – drums

 Additional personnel

 Steven Brown – synthesizer on "Jungle Song" and "She Was a Visitor"
 Michael Belfer – guitar on "The Shroud"
 Steve Wymore – bass guitar on "Jungle Song", clarinet on "She Was a Visitor"
 Hitoshi Sasaki – bass guitar on "High Why" and "I Don't Resist"
 Mike Fox – guitar on "You Are"
 Gary Miles – keyboards on "Now I Want It All"
 Stefano Paolillo – drums on "High Why"

 Technical

 Pierre Vale – mastering

References

External links 

 

1981 albums
Minimal Man albums